Tunks is a surname, and may refer to:

 Jason Tunks (born 1975), international level discus thrower
 Leicester Tunks (1880-1935), operatic baritone and actor
 Lieja Tunks (born 1976), shot putter
 Peter Tunks (born 1958), Australian former professional rugby league footballer
 Roy Tunks (born 1951), professional footballer
 William Tunks (born 1816), Australian politician

See also

 Tonks
 Trunks (disambiguation)
 Tunk